Victor "Vico" Haddad (Hebrew: ויקטור "ויקו" חדד) is a former Tunisian-Jewish Israeli footballer and football manager. He is the long-time manager of Ben-Gurion University of the Negev's Sports Center and, since 2013, the chairman of Asa, the national organization for academic sports.

References

1960 births
Israeli Jews
Living people
Israeli footballers
Israeli football managers
Hapoel Be'er Sheva F.C. players
Liga Leumit players
Hapoel Be'er Sheva F.C. managers
Maccabi Netanya F.C. managers
Hapoel Haifa F.C. managers
Hapoel Ironi Rishon LeZion F.C. managers
Bnei Yehuda Tel Aviv F.C. managers
Footballers from Beersheba
Israeli people of Tunisian-Jewish descent
Association footballers not categorized by position
Academic staff of Ben-Gurion University of the Negev